Chondromyxoid fibroma is a rare type of cartilaginous tumor. Rarely occur in the skull or skull base.

Most cases are characterised by GRM1 gene fusion or promoter swapping. It can be associated with a translocation at t(1;5)(p13;p13).

References

External links 

Osseous and chondromatous neoplasia